Ayub Kaley is a village in Khyber Agency of the Federally Administered Tribal Areas (FATA) of Pakistan. It is located on the Khyber Pass, the highway that links Kabul and Peshawar. In 2002 angry tribesmen installed anti aircraft guns in the area in a dispute with government.

References

Populated places in Khyber District